Natalia Charłos (born May 31, 1993) is a Polish-German distance swimmer. She was born in Elmshorn, Germany. At the 2012 Summer Olympics, Charłos competed for Poland in the Women's marathon 10 kilometre, finishing in 15th place.

Charłos nearly drowned during her participation in the Women's 10 kilometre of the 2014 European Aquatics Championships.

References

1993 births
Living people
People from Elmshorn
Olympic swimmers of Poland
Swimmers at the 2012 Summer Olympics
Polish female long-distance swimmers